The following is an alphabetical list of topics related to the British Overseas Territory of Montserrat.

0–9 

.ms – Internet country code top-level domain for Montserrat

A
Administrative divisions of Montserrat
Airports in Montserrat
Americas
North America
North Atlantic Ocean
West Indies
Caribbean Sea
Antilles
Lesser Antilles
Islands of Montserrat
Anglo-America
Antilles
Army of Montserrat
Atlas of Montserrat

B
Birds of Montserrat
Brades – Capital of Montserrat
British Overseas Territory of Montserrat

C
Capital of Montserrat:  Brades
Caribbean
Caribbean Community (CARICOM)
Caribbean Sea
Categories:
:Category:Montserrat
:Category:Buildings and structures in Montserrat
:Category:Communications in Montserrat
:Category:Economy of Montserrat

:Category:Education in Montserrat
:Category:Environment of Montserrat
:Category:Geography of Montserrat
:Category:Government of Montserrat
:Category:Health in Montserrat
:Category:History of Montserrat
:Category:Montserrat stubs
:Category:Montserratian culture
:Category:Montserratian people
:Category:Montserrat-related lists
:Category:Politics of Montserrat
:Category:Society of Montserrat
:Category:Sport in Montserrat
:Category:Transport in Montserrat
commons:Category:Montserrat
Climate of Montserrat
Coat of arms of Montserrat
Commonwealth of Nations
Communications in Montserrat
Cricket in the West Indies

D
Demographics of Montserrat

E
Economy of Montserrat
Education in Montserrat
Elberton, Montserrat
Elections in Montserrat
English colonization of the Americas
English language
Olaudah Equiano, famous resident, c. 1760s.

F

Flag of Montserrat

G
Geography of Montserrat
Government of Montserrat
Gross domestic product

H
History of Montserrat

I
International Organization for Standardization (ISO)
ISO 3166-1 alpha-2 country code for Montserrat: MS
ISO 3166-1 alpha-3 country code for Montserrat: MSR
Internet in Montserrat
Islands of Montserrat:
Montserrat island
Goat Islet
Little Redonda

L
Leeward Islands
Lesser Antilles
Lists related to Montserrat:
List of airports in Montserrat
List of birds of Montserrat
List of countries by GDP (nominal)
List of islands of Montserrat
List of mammals in Montserrat
List of Montserrat-related topics
List of places in Montserrat
List of political parties in Montserrat
List of rivers of Montserrat
List of volcanoes in Montserrat
Topic outline of Montserrat

M
Mammals of Montserrat
Military of Montserrat
Montserrat
Montserratian British people - there are more Montserratians in the UK than Montserrat
Music of Montserrat

N
North America
Northern Hemisphere

O
Organisation of Eastern Caribbean States (OECS)

P
Parishes of Montserrat
Political parties in Montserrat
Politics of Montserrat

R
Radio Antilles
Rivers of Montserrat

S
The Scout Association of Montserrat
Soufrière Hills
St. Patrick's Church, Lookout
Joseph Sturge
Edmund Sturge

T
Topic outline of Montserrat
Transport in Montserrat

U
United Kingdom of Great Britain and Northern Ireland

V
Volcanoes of Montserrat

W
Weekes, Montserrat
Western Hemisphere

Wikipedia:WikiProject Topic outline/Drafts/Topic outline of Montserrat

See also

List of Caribbean-related topics
List of international rankings
Lists of country-related topics
Topic outline of geography
Topic outline of Montserrat
Topic outline of North America

References

External links

 
Montserrat